This is a list of encyclopedias and encyclopedic/biographical dictionaries published on the subject of art and artists in any language. Entries are in the English language unless stated as otherwise.

General art 

American Federation of Arts. Who's who in American art. Marquis Who's Who [etc.], 1936/1937–. ISSN 0000-0191.
Artcyclopedia: The fine art search engine. Artcyclopedia, 1999–.http://artcyclopedia.com.
Ashwin, Clive. Encyclopedia of Drawing: Materials, Techniques and Style. North Light, 1983.
Atkins, Robert. Artspeak: A guide to contemporary ideas, movements, and buzzwords, 1945 to the present. Abbeville Press, 1997. .
Bahn, Paul G. The new Penguin dictionary of archaeology. Penguin, 2004. .
Ballast, David Kent. The encyclopedia of associations and information sources for architects, designers, and engineers. Sharpe Professional, 1998. .
Bénézit, E. Dictionary of artists Gründ, 2006. .
Berman, Esmé. Art and artists of South Africa: An illustrated biographical dictionary and historical survey of painters, sculptors and graphic artists since 1875. Southern Books, 1996. .
Boardman, John. Lexicon iconographicum mythologiae classicae (LIMC). Artemis, c1981–c1997. .
Brigstocke, Hugh. The Oxford companion to western art. Oxford University Press, 2001. .
The Britannica Encyclopedia of American Art. Encyclopædia Britannica Educational Corp., 1973.
Cahill, James, Osvald Sirén, Ellen Johnston Laing. An index of early Chinese painters and paintings: T'ang, Sung, and Yüan. University of California Press, 1980. .
Cancik, Hubert, Helmuth Schneider, Christine F. Salazar, David E. Orton. Brill's New Pauly: Encyclopaedia of the ancient world. Brill, 2002–. .

Chilvers, Ian. Concise Oxford Dictionary of Art and Artists. Oxford, 1990.
Chilvers, Ian. The Oxford dictionary of art. Oxford University Press, 2004. .
Chilvers, Ian and Harold Osborne. Oxford Dictionary of Art. Oxford, 1988.
Daniel, Howard. Encyclopedia of Themes and Subjects in Painting. Abrams, 1971.
Davenport, R. J., Gordon's Art Reference, Inc. Davenport's art reference and price guide. Gordon's Art Reference, Inc., 1984–. ISSN 1540-1553.
Dawdy, Doris Ostrander. Artists of the American West: A biographical dictionary. Sage Books, [1974]–c1985. .
DeMello, Margo. Encyclopedia of body adornment. Greenwood Press, 2007. .
Dunford, Penny. A biographical dictionary of women artists in Europe and America since 1850. University of Pennsylvania Press, 1989. .
Earls, Irene. Baroque art: A topical dictionary. Greenwood Press, 1996. .
Earls, Irene. Renaissance art: A topical dictionary. Greenwood Press, 1987. .

Enciclopedia dell'arte antica, classica e orientale. Istituto della Enciclopedia italiana, [1958–1985].

Encyclopedia of World Art. Publishers Guild, 1983.

Falk, Peter H., Audrey M. Lewis, Georgia Kuchen. Who was who in American art, 1564–1975: 400 years of artists in America. Sound View Press, 1999. .
Farris, Phoebe. Women artists of color: A bio-critical sourcebook to 20th century artists in the Americas. Greenwood Press, 1999. .
Fielding, Mantle, Glenn B. Opitz. Mantle Fielding's dictionary of American painters, sculptors and engravers. Apollo, 1986. .
Galería de Arte Nacional (Venezuela). Diccionario biográfico de las artes visuales en Venezuela. Fundación Galería de Arte Nacional, 2005. .
Gascoigne, Bamber. How to identify prints: A complete guide to manual and mechanical processes from woodcut to inkjet. Thames & Hudson, 2004. .
Gaze, Delia, Maja Mihajlovic, Leanda Shrimpton. Dictionary of women artists. Fitzroy Dearborn, 1997. .
Getty Research Institute. Union list of artist names online. Getty Research Institute. Available online here.
Giorgi, Rosa, Stefano Zuffi. Saints in art. J. Paul Getty Museum, 2003. .
Goldman, Paul. Looking at prints, drawings, and watercolours: A guide to technical terms. British Museum Press, 2006. .
Goldwater, Robert John, Marco Treves. Artists on art: From the 14th to the 20th century. J. Murray, 1976. .
Goulart, Ron. The Encyclopedia of American Comics. Facts on File, 1990.

Gowing, Lawrence. The Encyclopedia of Visual Art. Encyclopædia Britannica Educational Corp., 1989.
Hall, James. Dictionary of Subjects and Symbols in Art. Harper & Row, 2nd ed., 1979.
Hallmark, Kara Kelley. Encyclopedia of Asian American artists. Greenwood Press, 2007. .
Harris, Jonathan. Art history: The key concepts. Routledge, 2006. .
. A freely accessible online version is available.
Heller, Jules and Nancy Heller. North American women artists of the twentieth century: A biographical dictionary. Garland, 1995. .
Heller, Nancy G. Women artists: An illustrated history. Abbeville Press, 2003. .
Hillstrom, Laurie Collier, Kevin Hillstrom, Lucy R. Lippard. Contemporary women artists. St. James Press, 1999. .
Horn, Maurice. Contemporary graphic artists: A biographical, bibliographical, and critical guide to current illustrators, animators, cartoonists, designers, and other graphic artists. Gale Research, 1986–. .
Horn, Maurice. World Encyclopedia of Cartoons. Chelsea House, 1980.
Horn, Maurice. World Encyclopedia of Comics. Chelsea House, 1976.
Hornblower, Simon, Antony Spawforth. The Oxford classical dictionary. Oxford University Press, 2003. .
Houfe, Simon. The dictionary of 19th century British book illustrators and caricaturists. Antique Collectors' Club, 1996. .

Kazhdan, Alexander B. The Oxford Dictionary of Byzantium. Oxford University Press, 1991. .
Kelly, Michael. Encyclopedia of aesthetics. Oxford University Press, 1998. .
Kort, Carol, Liz Sonneborn. A to Z of American women in the visual arts. Facts on File, 2002. .
Marquis Who's Who. Who's who in American art. Marquis Who's Who, 1936/37-.

McGraw-Hill Dictionary of Art. McGraw-Hill, 1969.
Meissner, Günter, K. G. Saur. Allgemeines Künstlerlexikon: Die bildenden Künstler aller Zeiten und Völker. K. G. Saur, 1992–. . (German)
Meyer, George H., George H. Meyer, Jr., Katherine P. White, Museum of American Folk Art. Folk artists biographical index. Gale Research, 1987. .
Milner, John, Antique Collector's Club. A dictionary of Russian and Soviet artists, 1420–1970. Antique Collectors' Club, 1993. .

Murray, Peter and Linda Murray. Dictionary of Art and Artists. Penguin, 1972.
Museum of Fine Arts, Boston. Conservation and art materials encyclopedia online: CAMEO. Museum of Fine Arts, Boston. .
Naylor, Colin, Leana Shrimpton. Contemporary masterworks. St. James Press, 1991. .
Nelson, Robert S., Richard Shiff. Critical terms for art history. University of Chicago Press, 2003. .
Newland, Amy Reigle. The Hotei encyclopedia of Japanese woodblock prints. Hotei Publishing, 2005. .
Ormond, Richard, Malcolm Rogers, Adriana Davies. Dictionary of British portraiture. Oxford University Press, 1979–1981. .
Osborne, Harold. Oxford Companion to Art. Oxford, 1970.
Osborne, Harold. Oxford Companion to the Decorative Arts. Oxford, 1975.
Osborne, Harold. Oxford Companion to Twentieth Century Art. Oxford, 1982.
Oxford art online. Oxford University Press, 2008–. .
Palmer, Frederick. Encyclopedia of Oil Painting: Materials and Techniques. North Light, 1984.
Pendergast, Sara, Tom Pendergast. Contemporary artists. St. James Press, 2002. .
Petteys, Chris. Dictionary of women artists: An international dictionary of women artists born before 1900. G.K. Hall, 1985. .
Piper, David. Random House Dictionary of Art and Artists. Random House, 1990.
Praeger Dictionary of Art. Praeger, 1971.

Reid, Jane Davidson and Chris Rohman. The Oxford guide to classical mythology in the arts, 1300–1990s. Oxford University Press, 1993. .
Riggs, Thomas, Schomburg Center for Research in Black Culture. St. James guide to black artists. St. James Press, 1997. .
Riggs, Thomas, Association of Hispanic Arts (New York). St. James guide to Hispanic artists: Profiles of Latino and Latin American artists. St. James Press, 2002. .
Sill, Gertrude Grace. Handbook of Symbols in Christian Art. Macmillan, 1975.
Smithsonian Institution. Galaxy of knowledge: Smithsonian Institution Libraries. Smithsonian Institution, 2002. .
Smithsonian Institution. Smithsonian Institution research information system: SIRIS. Smithsonian Institution, 207-. .
Stanos, Nikos. Concepts of modern art: From fauvism to postmodernism. Thames and Hudson, 1994. .
Stevenson, George A. Graphic Arts Encyclopedia. Design Press, 1992.

Summers, Claude J. The queer encyclopedia of the visual arts. Cleis Press, 2004. .
Thames and Hudson Dictionary of Art and Artists. Thames and Hudson, 1985.

Vollmer, Hans. Allgemeines Lexikon der bildenden Künstler des XX. Jahrhunderts. Seemann, [1979?].
Walker, John Albert, Clive Phillpot. Glossary of art, architecture and design since 1945. G.K. Hall, 1992. .
Wertkin, Gerard C., Lee Kogan American Folk Art Museum. Encyclopedia of American folk art. Routledge, 2004. .
World Monuments Fund. World monuments watch: 100 most endangered sites. 2007–. .

Architecture 

Calloway, Stephen. Elements of Style: A Practical Encyclopedia of Interior Architectural Details from 1485 to the Present. Simon & Schuster, 1991.
Packard, Robert T. and Balthazar Korab. Encyclopedia of American Architecture. McGraw-Hill, 1994.

Decorative arts and antiques 

Cameron, Ian and Elizabeth Kingsley-Rowe. Random House Encyclopedia of Antiques. Random House, 1973.
Engen, Rodney K. Dictionary of Victorian wood engravers. Chadwyck-Healey, 1985. .
Garner, Philippe. Encyclopedia of Decorative Arts, 1890–1940. Van Nostrand, 1979.
Mackay, James. Encyclopedia of Small Antiques. Harper & Row, 1975.
Phillips, Phoebe. The Collectors' Encyclopedia of Antiques. Crown, 1973; Smith, 1989.
Phipps, Frances. Collector's Complete Dictionary of American Antiques. Doubleday, 1974.
Ramsey, L. G. G. Complete Color Encyclopedia of Antiques. 2nd ed., Hawthorn, 1975.
Random House Collector's Encyclopedia: Victoriana to Art Deco. Random House, 1974.
Ross, Mabel. Encyclopedia of Handspinning. Interweave Press, 1988.
Savage, George. Dictionary of 19th Century Antiques and Later Objets d'Art. Putnam, 1978.
Torbet, Laura. The Encyclopedia of Crafts. Scribner's, 1980.
Wills, Geoffrey. Concise Encyclopedia of Antiques. Van Nostrand, 1976.

Engraving 
Engen, Rodney K. Dictionary of Victorian wood engravers. Chadwyck-Healey, 1985. .

Furniture 
Aronson, Joseph. Encyclopedia of Furniture. 3rd ed., Crown, 1965.
Boyce, Charles. Dictionary of Furniture. Facts on File, 1985.
Fairbanks, Jonathan and Elizabeth Bidwell Bates. American Furniture: 1620 to the Present. Marek, 1981.
Gloag, John and Clive Edwards. A Complete Dictionary of Furniture. Rev. ed., Overlook Press, 1991.

Jewelry 
Newman, Harold. Illustrated Dictionary of Jewelry. Thames & Hudson, 1987.

Pottery and porcelain 
Boger, Louise Ade. Dictionary of World Pottery and Porcelain. Scribner's, 1970.
Cameron, Elisabeth. Encyclopedia of Pottery & Porcelain, 1800–1960. Facts on File, 1986.
Hamer, Frank and Janet. Potter's Dictionary of Materials and Techniques. 3rd ed., University of Pennsylvania Press, 1991.

Textiles 
Jerde, Judith. The Encyclopedia of Textiles. Facts on File, 1992.
Racinet, August. Historical Encyclopedia of Costume. Facts on File, 1988.
Sichel, Marion. Costume Reference. Plays, Inc., 1977–78.
Wilcox, Turner. Dictionary of Costume. Scribner's, 1968.
Yarwood, Doreen. The Encyclopedia of World Costume. Scribner's, 1978; Outlet Book Company, 1988.

Design 
Byars, Mel (2004): The Design Encyclopedia, New York, The Museum of Modern Art, 832 pages. .
Fleming, John & Hugh Honour. The Penguin Dictionary of Decorative Arts. rev. ed., Viking, 1990.
Jervis, Simon. Facts on File Dictionary of Design and Designers. Facts on File, 1984.
Livingston, Alan, Isabella Livingston. The Thames and Hudson dictionary of graphic design and designers. Thames & Hudson, 2003. .
Morteo, Enrico (2008): Grande Atlante del Design dal 1850 a oggi, Electa – Mondadori, 422 pages. . 
Osborne, Harold. The Oxford Companion to the Decorative Arts. Oxford, 1975.
Pendergast, Sara. Contemporary designers. St. James Press, 1997. .
Pile, John. Dictionary of 20th-Century Design. Facts on File, 1990.
Riley, Noël, Bayer, Patricia (2003): The Elements of Design: a practical encyclopedia of the decorative arts from the Renaissance to the present, Free Press, 544 pages. .

Photography 
Auer, Michèle, Michel Auer. Encyclopédie internationale des photographes de 1839 à nos jours = Photographers encyclopaedia international 1839 to the present. (in English and French). Editions Camera obscura, 1985. .
Auer, Michel, Michèle, Ides et calendes. Encyclopédie internationale des photographes des débuts à nos jours = Photographers encyclopedia international from its beginnings to the present. Ides et calendes, 1997. .
Browne, Turner, Elaine Partnow. Macmillan biographical encyclopedia of photographic artists and innovators. Macmillan; Collier Macmillan, 1983. .
Carroll, John and William Broecker. Encyclopedia of Practical Photography. Amphoto, 1977–1978.
International Center of Photography Encyclopedia of Photography. Crown, 1984.
Evans, Martin Marix, Amanda Hopkinson, Andrei Baskakov. Contemporary photographers. St. James Press, 1995. .
Hannavy, John. Encyclopedia of nineteenth-century photography. Taylor & Francis Group, 2008. .
Mautz, Carl. Biographies of western photographers: A reference guide to photographers working in the 19th century American West. Carl Mautz, 1997. .
Peres, Michael R. The Focal encyclopedia of photography: Digital imaging, theory and applications, history, and science. Elsevier/Focal Press, 2007. .
Stroebel, Leslie and Richard D. Zakia. The Focal Encyclopedia of Photography. Focal Press, 1993.
Warren, Lynne. Encyclopedia of twentieth-century photography. Routledge, 2006. .
Willis-Thomas, Deborah. An illustrated bio-bibliography of black photographers, 1940–1988. Garland, 1989. .

Sculpture 
Beaulieu, Michèle, Victor Beyer. Dictionnaire des sculpteurs français du moyen age. Picard, 1992. .
Boström, Antonia (2003): The Encyclopedia of Sculpture, 3 vols, Routledge, 1,936 pages. .
Dürre, Stefan (2007): Seemanns Lexikon der Skulptur: Bildhauer, Epochen, Themen, Techniken, Seeman, 464 pages. . 
Gunnis, Rupert (1953: later editions 1968 and 2009): Dictionary of British Sculptors 1660–1851
Hachet, Jean-Charles (2005): Dictionnaire des sculpteurs et fondeurs animaliers de l'Antiquité à nos jours, Argusvalentines, 2 vols, 1,088 pages. . 
Mills, John (2005): Encyclopedia of Sculpture Techniques, paperback, Batsford, 240 pages. .
Opitz, Glenn B. Dictionary of American sculptors: 18th century to the present, illustrated with over 200 photographs. Apollo, 1984. .

Symbolism 

Hall, James. Dictionary of Subjects and Symbols in Art. Harper & Row, 1979.
Roberts, Helene E. Encyclopedia of comparative iconography: Themes depicted in works of art. Fitzroy Dearborn, 1998. .
Rochelle, Mercedes. Post-Biblical saints art index: A locator of paintings, sculptures, mosaics, icons, frescoes, manuscript illuminations, sketches, woodcuts, and engravings, created from the 4th century to 1950, with a directory of the institutions holding them. McFarland, 1994. .
Sill, Gertrude Grace. Handbook of Symbols in Christian Art. Macmillan, 1975.
Speake, Jennifer. The Dent dictionary of symbols in Christian art. J. M. Dent, 1994. .

See also 
 Bibliography of encyclopedias

References

Bibliography 
Guide to Reference.  American Library Association. Retrieved 5 December 2014. (subscription required).
Kister, Kenneth F. (1994). Kister's Best Encyclopedias (2nd ed.). Phoenix: Oryx. .

Art
The arts